Cerithiopsilla burdwoodiana is a species of  very small sea snail, a marine gastropod mollusc in the family Cerithiopsidae. This species was described by Melvill and Standen in 1912.

Description 
The maximum recorded shell length is 4 mm.

Habitat 
Minimum recorded depth is 63 m. Maximum recorded depth is 102 m.

References

External links

Cerithiopsidae
Gastropods described in 1912